Chelsea Career & Technical Education High School (formerly Chelsea Vocational High School, NYCDOE#M615) is a public Career and Technical Education (CTE) high school located at 131 Avenue of the Americas, New York, New York, United States. It is a part of district 2 in the New York City Department of Education.

History
In 2011 the school began obtaining a $1 million grant and used it to buy electronic equipment.

Curriculum
The curriculum at Chelsea is arranged so that all students may take their chosen CTE sequence, while earning a regular or advanced regents high school diploma. Each student is required to take the same classes as the average high school student, with the exception that the foreign language requirement is only 2 credits (one full year instead of three). The only language offered at Chelsea is Spanish. In the requirements for an Advanced Regents diploma, the foreign language proficiency regent is exempted due to the many hours of their CTE sequences, averaging a full hour every day. In addition, Chelsea has advanced placement (AP) courses which include Calculus AB, English Literature and Composition, Government and Politics: United States, Physics C: Mechanics, Spanish Language, and United States History.

CTE shop classes
The shops (Information technology & Graphic design) are all pre-approved programs by the Department of Education and related industries. Each program has its own certification to be obtained by taking a test in the senior year, and all programs have internship opportunities.
Source: 

Additionally, based on industry and DOE standards, a student graduating from Chelsea High School may be eligible for a Technical Endorsement seal on their diploma, which is equivalent to work experience of two years related to their CTE sequence.

Athletics and extracurricular activities

Source:

References

External links

Chelsea Career & Technical Education High School
Profile at NYCDOE

Public high schools in Manhattan
SoHo, Manhattan
Sixth Avenue
Educational institutions established in 1938
1938 establishments in New York City